Joseph Graham (born June 11, 1982) is an American former professional basketball player who played six seasons in the National Basketball Association (NBA).

College career
Graham played college basketball for the University of Central Florida (2000–02) and Oklahoma State University (2003–05). He averaged 13.0 points and 5.2 rebounds in four collegiate seasons and helped OSU to the Final Four in his junior campaign.

Professional career

Toronto Raptors (2005–2009)
Graham was selected by the Toronto Raptors with the 16th overall pick in the 2005 NBA draft. In his first two seasons with the Raptors, he averaged 6.5 points and 3.1 rebounds in 159 regular season games, and shot .826 (218–264) from the charity stripe. He registered a career-high 19 points on five occasions and grabbed a personal-best 12 rebounds on March 30, 2007 against the Washington Wizards.

Graham missed the majority of Toronto's November schedule in the 2007–08 season. He appeared in a career-low 38 games in 2007–08. He averaged career highs in 2008–09, with 7.7 points and 3.7 rebounds per game. On February 1, 2009, he recorded a career high-tying 12 rebounds against the Orlando Magic. Three days later, he scored a career-high 24 points against the Los Angeles Lakers. Another six days later, he tied his career high with 24 points against the Minnesota Timberwolves.

Denver Nuggets and Cleveland Cavaliers (2009–2011)

On September 26, 2009, Graham signed with the Denver Nuggets. On July 30, 2010, Graham signed with the Cleveland Cavaliers. On December 9, 2011, prior to the start of the 2011–12 training camp period, Graham was waived by the Cavaliers.

D-League and Puerto Rico (2012–2013)
On March 19, 2012, Graham was acquired by the Erie BayHawks of the NBA Development League.

On May 4, 2012, Graham signed with Mets de Guaynabo of the Baloncesto Superior Nacional.

In February 2013, Graham joined Capitanes de Arecibo. On April 15, 2013, he parted ways with Arecibo. Two days later, he signed with Mets de Guaynabo, returning to the team for a second stint.

NBA career statistics

Regular season 

|-
| align="left" | 
| align="left" | Toronto
| 80 || 24 || 19.8 || .478 || .333 || .812 || 3.1 || .8 || .5 || .2 || 6.7
|-
| align="left" | 
| align="left" | Toronto
| 79 || 21 || 16.7 || .495 || .290 || .840 || 3.1 || .6 || .4 || .1 || 6.4
|-
| align="left" | 
| align="left" | Toronto
| 38 || 3 || 8.7 || .434 || .667 || .844 || 1.8 || .4 || .1 || .0 || 3.6
|-
| align="left" | 
| align="left" | Toronto
| 78 || 10 || 19.8 || .481 || .188 || .825 || 3.7 || .6 || .4 || .2 || 7.7
|-
| align="left" | 
| align="left" | Denver
| 63 || 18 || 12.0 || .520 || .154 || .740 || 2.0 || .3 || .4 || .1 || 4.2
|-
| align="left" | 
| align="left" | Cleveland
| 39 || 8 || 15.0 || .458 || .300 || .806 || 2.2 || .5 || .2 || .2 || 5.2
|- class="sortbottom"
| style="text-align:center;" colspan="2"| Career
| 377 || 84 || 16.2 || .483 || .300 || .815 || 2.8 || .5 || .4 || .1 || 5.9

Playoffs 

|-
| align="left" | 2007
| align="left" | Toronto
| 6 || 3 || 18.2 || .286 || .000 || .800 || 3.3 || .3 || .7 || .0 || 2.7
|-
| align="left" | 2008
| align="left" | Toronto
| 2 || 0 || 1.0 || .000 || .000 || .000 || .0 || .0 || .0 || .0 || .0
|-
| align="left" | 2010
| align="left" | Denver
| 4 || 0 || 7.3 || .588 || .333 || .600 || 2.5 || .0 || .5 || .3 || 6.0
|- class="sortbottom"
| style="text-align:center;" colspan="2"| Career
| 12 || 3 || 11.7 || .400 || .200 || .700 || 2.5 || .2 || .5 || .1 || 3.3

Personal
Graham's twin brother, Stephen, also played in the NBA. His father, Joe Graham, is a former Navy airman.

References

External links

Joey Graham at nba.com

1982 births
Living people
African-American basketball players
All-American college men's basketball players
American expatriate basketball people in Canada
American men's basketball players
Basketball players from Wilmington, Delaware
Capitanes de Arecibo players
Cleveland Cavaliers players
Denver Nuggets players
Erie BayHawks (2008–2017) players
Oklahoma State Cowboys basketball players
Small forwards
Toronto Raptors draft picks
Toronto Raptors players
American twins
Twin sportspeople
UCF Knights men's basketball players
21st-century African-American sportspeople
20th-century African-American people